Antilla is a municipality in Holguín Province of Cuba. It was founded in January 21, 1925 as a railroad terminal and port town.

Geography
It is located on the north-eastern shore of Cuba, on a peninsula between the Gulf of Nipe and Banes Bay.

Demographics
In 2004, the municipality of Antilla had a population of 12,542.

Notable people
 Pablo Ferro (1935–2018), Cuban-American graphic designer and film titles designer

See also

List of cities in Cuba
Municipalities of Cuba

References

External links

 Antilla on guije.com

Populated places in Holguín Province
Port cities and towns in Cuba
Populated places established in 1907
1907 establishments in Cuba